Joe Albany at Home is a solo album by the pianist Joe Albany, recorded in 1971 and released on the Spotlite label in the UK and on the Revelation label in the US as At Home Alone in 1976.

Reception 

Allmusic's Scott Yanow wrote, "This release was quite important for a couple of reasons. It was the first LP put out by the British Spotlite label and only the second date led by the legendary (and until then largely forgotten) bop pianist Joe Albany ... The recording quality is decent if not state-of-the-art, but the playing is quite excellent and fortunately led to the rediscovery of this important "missing link"".

Track listing 
 "What's New?" (Bob Haggart, Johnny Burke) – 4:37
 "You're Blasé" (Ord Hamilton, Bruce Sievier) – 3:52
 "Why Was I Born?" (Jerome Kern, Oscar Hammerstein II) – 4:10
 "Jitterbug Waltz" (Fats Waller) – 4:08
 "Night and Day" (Cole Porter) – 4:12
 "What Are You Doing the Rest of Your Life?" (Michel Legrand, Alan Bergman, Marilyn Bergman) – 4:05
 "Barbados" (Charlie Parker) – 2:19
 "Can't We Be Friends?" (Kay Swift, Paul James) – 3:41
 "Everything Happens to Me" (Matt Dennis, Tom Adair) – 3:40
 "You've Changed" (Bill Carey, Carl Fischer) – 3:43
 "Birdtown Birds" (Joe Albany) – 2:01
 "Isn't It Romantic?" (Richard Rodgers, Lorenz Hart) – 3:19

Personnel 
Joe Albany – piano

References 

Joe Albany albums
1971 albums
Spotlite Records albums
Revelation Records (jazz) albums